McKay's bunting (Plectrophenax hyperboreus) is a passerine bird in the longspur family Calcariidae. It is most closely related to the snow bunting (P. nivalis). Hybrids between the two species have been observed, leading some authorities to treat McKay's as a subspecies of snow bunting. As the Plectrophenax buntings are nested within the Calcarius clade, their closest relatives are the longspurs. McKay's bunting breeds on two islands in the Bering Sea, St. Matthew and Hall islands, and winters on the western coast of the U.S. state of Alaska.

Description
This species closely resembles snow bunting in all plumages, but is whiter overall. The breeding plumage of the male is almost purely white, with only small areas of black on the wingtips and tail. The breeding female has a streaked back. Non-breeding birds also have warm brown patches on cheeks, crown, and the sides of the neck. McKay's bunting is larger on average than the snow bunting.

Ecology
This bunting nests on shingle beaches in hollow drift logs and rock crevices. Winters on coastal marshes, shingle beaches, and agricultural fields. Feeding habits are thought to be similar to snow bunting, which in winter consumes seeds from weeds and grasses, and in summer has a mixed diet of seeds, buds, and insects.

Status
The population of this species is estimated at less than 6,000 individuals. Although under no immediate threat, it is susceptible to devastation by any introduced rats, weasels or foxes.

The name of this bird honors the American naturalist Charles McKay.

References

Further reading

Book

 Lyon, B., and R. Montgomerie. 1995. Snow Bunting and McKay’s Bunting (Plectrophenax nivalis and Plectrophenax hyperboreus). In The Birds of North America, No. 198–199. (A. Poole and F. Gill, eds.). The Academy of Natural Sciences, Philadelphia, and The American Ornithologists’ Union, Washington, D.C.

Articles

 Maley JM & Winker K. (2010). Diversification at high latitudes: speciation of buntings in the genus Plectrophenax inferred from mitochondrial and nuclear markers. Molecular Ecology vol 19, no 4., p.  785–797.
 Maley JM & Winker K. (2007). Use of juvenal plumage in diagnosing species limits: an example using buntings in the genus Plectrophenax. Auk vol 124, no. 3. p. 907-915
 Rogers, J. (2005). Identifying McKay’s Bunting. Birding vol 37 , no 6. p. 618-626.
 Johnson JA, Matsuoka SM, Ruthrauff DR, Litzow MA & Dementyev MN. (2004). Additions to the avifauna of St. Matthew Island, Bering Sea. Western Birds. vol 35, no 1. p. 50-52.
 Winker K, Gibson DD, Sowls AL, Lawhead BE, Martin PD, Hoberg EP & Causey D. (2002). The birds of St. Matthew Island, Bering Sea. Wilson Bulletin. vol 114, no 4. p. 491-509.
 Lyon B & Montgomerie R. (1995). Snow Bunting and McKay's Bunting (Plectrophenax nivalis and Plectrophenax hyperboreus). Birds of North America. vol 0, no 198–199. p. 1-28.
 Sealy SG. (1972). Additional Winter Records of the Mckay's Bunting. Canadian Field-Naturalist. vol 86, no 4. p. 386-388.
 Sealy SG. (1969). Apparent Hybridization between Snow Bunting and Mckay's Bunting on St-Lawrence Island Alaska USA. Auk. vol 86, no 2. p. 350-351.

External links
BirdLife Species Factsheet

McKay's bunting
Native birds of Alaska
McKay's bunting
Taxa named by Robert Ridgway
Endemic fauna of Alaska